The United Protestant Church in Belgium (VPKB/EPUB) is a minority Christian church in Belgium, where the majority of the population is Catholic. It is the largest Protestant denomination in the country. The name of the church in Dutch is Verenigde Protestantse Kerk in België (VPKB) and in French is l'Église Protestante Unie de Belgique (EPUB). The church has about 50,000 members.

The current President of the church is Steven Fuite. The offices of the church are at Brogniezstraat or Rue Brogniez in Anderlecht (Brussels). The church is a member of the Conference of European Churches and the World Communion of Reformed Churches. In 2015, the church voted to ordain openly gay and lesbian pastors. Ordination of women and blessings of same-sex marriages are allowed.

See also
St Andrew's Church, Brussels
Religion in Belgium

References

External links
 Website
 Website
 French-language website of the Protestant Church of Rixensart, Belgium

Calvinist denominations established in the 20th century
Lutheran denominations established in the 20th century
Lutheran World Federation members
Members of the World Council of Churches
Members of the World Communion of Reformed Churches
Protestantism in Belgium
Reformed denominations in Europe
Christian organizations established in 1979